Stigmatella may refer to:
 Stigmatella (bacterium), a genus of Myxobacteria in the family Archangiaceae
 Stigmatella (bryozoan), a genus of prehistoric bryozoans in the family Heterotrypidae